A number of steamships have been named Gothic, including

 was an ocean liner built in 1893 and scrapped in 1926
, a British tanker in service 1939–40
, a British cargo ship in service 1922–39
, a British cargo liner in service from 1948 to at least 1958.

Ship names